Melissa Gatto Regonha (born May 2, 1996) is a Brazilian professional mixed martial artist who currently fights in the women's flyweight division of the Ultimate Fighting Championship.

Background
Gatto was born and grew up in Toledo, Paraná, Brazil, with an older and a younger brother. Following her big brother, she started training Kung Fu at the age of eight. Gradually she picked up also other disciplines eventually drifting to mixed martial arts in order to challenge herself. She attended Western Paraná State University from where she graduated with bachelor's degree in languages.

Mixed martial arts career

Early career
Gatto racked up a record of 6–0–2 in Brazilian regional circuit before signing a contract with the UFC. In her last bout before the UFC, she submitted fellow future UFC fighter Karol Rosa with a first round kimura at Nação Cyborg 3.

Ultimate Fighting Championship 
Gatto was scheduled to make her UFC debut replacing injured Jessica Rose-Clark on short notice against Talita Bernardo at UFC 237 on May 11, 2019. However, Gatto was pulled from the fight in the days leading up to the event and replaced by Viviane Araújo.

She was then scheduled to face Julia Avila at UFC 239 on July 6, 2019. However, she ended up pulling out citing an injury and was replaced by Pannie Kianzad. Later, news surfaced that Gatto was in fact pulled from the card due to testing positive for furosemide, a diuretic. She was given a USADA suspension and was eligibly to return to competition on June 5, 2020.

She was scheduled to face Mariya Agapova at UFC on ESPN: Eye vs. Calvillo on June 13, 2020. However, Gatto pulled out due to visa issues and was replaced by Hannah Cifers.

She ultimately made her debut against Victoria Leonardo at UFC 265 on August 7, 2021. She won the fight via technical knockout after the doctor stopped the fight between rounds two and three due to an arm injury sustained by Leonardo.

In her sophomore appearance Gatto faced Sijara Eubanks on December 18, 2021 at UFC Fight Night: Lewis vs. Daukaus. At the weigh-ins, Eubanks weighed in at 127.5 pounds, 1.5 pounds over the flyweight non-title fight limit. The bout proceeded at a catchweight. She won the fight via body kick TKO in the third round. The win earned her a Performance of the Night bonus award.

Gatto then faced Tracy Cortez at UFC 274 on May 7, 2022. She lost the fight via unanimous decision.

Gatto was scheduled to face Gillian Robertson on September 17, 2022 at UFC Fight Night 210. However, Gatto was removed from the event for undisclosed reasons.

Championships and accomplishments
Ultimate Fighting Championship
Performance of the Night (One time)

Mixed martial arts record

|-
|Loss
|align=center|8–1–2
|Tracy Cortez
|Decision (unanimous)
|UFC 274
|
|align=center|3
|align=center|5:00
|Phoenix, Arizona, United States
|
|-
|Win
|align=center|8–0–2
|Sijara Eubanks
|TKO (body kick and punches)
|UFC Fight Night: Lewis vs. Daukaus
|
|align=center|3
|align=center|0:45
|Las Vegas, Nevada, United States
|
|-
|Win
|align=center|7–0–2
|Victoria Leonardo
|TKO (doctor stoppage)
|UFC 265 
|
|align=center|2
|align=center|5:00
|Houston, Texas, United States
|
|-
|Win
|align=center|6–0–2
|Karol Rosa
|Submission (kimura)
|Nação Cyborg 3
|
|align=center|1
|align=center|4:19
|Curitiba, Brazil
|
|-
|Draw
|align=center|5–0–2
|Sidy Rocha
|Draw (split)
|Pantanal Fight Champions 2
|
|align=center|3
|align=center|5:00
|Corumbá, Brazil
|
|-
|Win
|align=center|5–0–1
|Joice de Andrade
|Submission (armbar)
|Clev Fight 1
|
|align=center|1
|align=center|2:34
|Clevelândia, Brazil
|
|-
|Win
|align=center|4–0–1
|Kethylen Rothenburg
|Submission (armbar)
|Nação Cyborg 1
|
|align=center|1
|align=center|1:36
|Colombo, Brazil
|
|-
|Draw
|align=center|3–0–1
|Edna Oliveira Ajala
|Draw (majority)
|Bonito Eco Fight Combat 2
|
|align=center|3
|align=center|5:00
|Bonito, Brazil
|
|-
|Win
|align=center|3–0
|Rafaela Thomazini
|Submission (rear-naked choke)
|Spartacus Circuit 9
|
|align=center|1
|align=center|1:09
|Cascavel, Brazil
|
|-
|Win
|align=center|2–0
|Taynara Silva
|Decision (unanimous)
|Pantanal Fight Champions
|
|align=center|3
|align=center|5:00
|Corumbá, Brazil
|
|-
|Win
|align=center|1–0
|Alexandra Alves
|Decision (unanimous)
|Spartacus Circuit 8
|
|align=center|3
|align=center|5:00
|Cascavel, Brazil
|
|-

See also 
 List of current UFC fighters
 List of female mixed martial artists

References

External links
 
 

1996 births
Living people
Flyweight mixed martial artists
Brazilian female mixed martial artists
Mixed martial artists utilizing wushu
Mixed martial artists utilizing Brazilian jiu-jitsu
Brazilian wushu practitioners
Brazilian practitioners of Brazilian jiu-jitsu
Female Brazilian jiu-jitsu practitioners
Ultimate Fighting Championship female fighters
21st-century American women